The fourth round of the women's team pursuit of the 2007–2008 UCI Track Cycling World Cup Classics took place in Copenhagen, Denmark on 17 February 2008. Six teams of three riders participated in the contest.

Competition format
The women's team pursuit consists of a 3 km time trial race between two riders, starting on opposite sides of the track. If one team catches the other, the race is over.

The tournament consisted of an initial qualifying round.  The top two riders in the qualifying round advanced to the gold medal match and the third and fourth riders advanced to the bronze medal race.

Schedule
Sunday 17 February
10:40-11:20 Qualifying
16:10-16:25 Finals
16:50-17:00 Victory Ceremony

Schedule from Tissottiming.com

Results

Qualifying

Results from Tissottiming.com.

Finals

Final bronze medal race

Results from Tissottiming.com.

Final gold medal race

Results from Tissottiming.com.

See also
 2007–08 UCI Track Cycling World Cup Classics – Round 4 – Women's individual pursuit
 2007–08 UCI Track Cycling World Cup Classics – Round 4 – Women's points race
 2007–08 UCI Track Cycling World Cup Classics – Round 4 – Women's scratch
 UCI Track Cycling World Cup Classics – Women's team pursuit

References

2007–08 UCI Track Cycling World Cup Classics
2008 in Danish sport
UCI Track Cycling World Cup – Women's team pursuit